Rommel is a German surname.  Notable people with the surname include:

 Erwin Rommel (1891–1944), German field marshal of the Second World War
 Manfred Rommel (1928–2013), mayor of Stuttgart and son of Erwin Rommel
 Adrien Rommel (1914–1963), French fencer
 Eddie Rommel (1897–1970), American baseball pitcher and umpire
 Frank Rommel (born 1984), German skeleton racer
 John Rommel (born 1958), American trumpeter
 Julia Rommel, American painter
 Kurt Rommel (1926–2011), German Protestant pastor, author and hymnodist

See also 
 Rómmel, Polish surname
 Rommel (disambiguation)

German-language surnames